John Francis Kennedy may refer to:

 John Francis Kennedy (politician) (1905–1994), American politician
 John Kennedy (Australian musician) also known as John Francis Kennedy (born 1958), Australian musician
 John Kennedy (public servant) born as John Joseph Francis Kennedy, Australian public servant

See also
 John F. Kennedy (disambiguation)